The defending champions were Larisa Savchenko and Natasha Zvereva, but Savchenko chose not to participate. Zvereva partnered Patty Fendick, but lost in the quarterfinals to Arantxa Sánchez Vicario and Nathalie Tauziat.

Martina Navratilova and Anne Smith won the tite, defeating Sánchez Vicario and Tauziat in the finals, 6–7(9–11), 6–4, 6–3.

Seeds

Draw

Rerences

External links 
 ITF tournament edition details

Virginia Slims of Chicago
Ameritech Cup
Virginia Slims of Chicago